Chao are fictional life-forms in the Sonic the Hedgehog video game series published by Sega. They are small, childlike creatures that go through a complex life cycle and exist in several visual forms depending on how they are raised. Developer Sonic Team incorporated Chao into the games to encourage players to explore levels and support the good–evil dichotomy of Sonic Adventure 2.

Chao have appeared in many games in the series, beginning with Sonic Adventure in 1998. They usually take the form of digital pets, but have also played parts in the story and figured into other gameplay elements. Most notably, the character Cream the Rabbit has a Chao named Cheese, whom she uses to attack enemies. They have also appeared in games outside the series, the Sonic the Hedgehog comics, and the Sonic X anime, as well as being featured in promotions and merchandise. Critics have given overall positive opinions on Chao and their integration into Sonic gameplay, generally praising their worth as a diversion.

Conception and characteristics
Chao are based on a special technology called A-Life, originally created for Sonic Team's NiGHTS into Dreams where it was used for similar virtual pets called Nightopians.

Sonic Team's Takashi Iizuka stated in an interview with video game publication 1UP.com that Chao were incorporated into Sonic Adventure "so that new players would be forced to go out, explore the action sections, and find Flickies and things." Chao were designed as a "relative neutral entity" in this game. However, to remain consistent with the good–evil dichotomy of Sonic Adventure 2, they were designed so that the player could raise them as "Hero Chao" or "Dark Chao". Chao were given the ability to socialize and interact in Sonic Adventure 2 in order to make the game unique, and to more resemble "a real artificial life form."

Chao are small creatures with a pudding-like body and behave much like human infants, with pleasant and relaxing personalities. Professor Chao, a minor character in Sonic Adventure 2, states that Chao are cute, and enjoy toys and being held or petted. However, they dislike being held while the player jumps, spins around, or throws them. Chao's diets consist of tree fruit and coconuts. Chao hatch from eggs found in Chao Gardens. When the player spends enough time with a Chao in the Chao Garden, the Chao develops a cocoon; it hatches from this as an adult. Eventually it develops another cocoon. If the Chao has been treated well, the cocoon is pink and the Chao is reincarnated as an egg; the cycle then restarts and the Chao remembers the player. If, however, the Chao has been treated poorly, the cocoon is gray and the Chao dies, removing every trace of itself from the game. Chao can breed to produce fertile eggs. In Sonic Adventure 2, the player can give Chao Chaos Drives to increase their stats, thus allowing them to perform better in minigames like Chao Racing.

Appearances

In video games
Chao have appeared in numerous Sonic the Hedgehog video games as digital pets. They made their first appearance in the 1998(JP) / 1999(NTSC/PAL) Dreamcast game Sonic Adventure. The player can raise them, enter them in races, and export them to Chao Adventure, a game for the Dreamcast's VMU peripheral. The player can also trade Chao or post their high scores online using the Dreamcast's Internet capabilities. The Chao raising feature was expanded in Sonic Adventure 2; Chao may become "Hero Chao", "Dark Chao" or "Neutral Chao" depending on whether the game's "hero" characters (Sonic the Hedgehog, Miles "Tails" Prower, and Knuckles the Echidna) or "dark" characters (Shadow the Hedgehog, Doctor Eggman, and Rouge the Bat) are nicer to them. Chao can enter karate competitions in this game, as well as racing. The Game Boy Advance (GBA) games Sonic Advance, Sonic Advance 2, and Sonic Pinball Party feature a "Tiny Chao Garden", similar to the Chao Gardens of Sonic Adventure and Sonic Adventure 2 but with minigames in place of racing and karate competitions. Chao can be transferred between Sonic Adventure 2 Battle and Sonic Adventure DX: Director's Cut—GameCube ports of Sonic Adventure 2 and Sonic Adventure—and the GBA games featuring a Tiny Chao Garden. Unusually, a generic Chao is an unlockable character in the party game Sonic Shuffle.

Chao have also appeared in the series as minor characters and gameplay elements. Two Chao—one Neutral and one Dark—who drive Chao-styled mechas are playable characters in the two-player battle mode of Sonic Adventure 2: Battle. On the Sonic the Hedgehog-styled pinball board in Sonic Pinball Party, one of the player's objectives is to hatch several Chao eggs. Each world in the 2004 GBA game Sonic Advance 3 features Chao-inspired minigames to earn extra lives for the player, and a sidequest that involves finding Chao to obtain Chaos Emeralds. 2007's PlayStation Portable installment Sonic Rivals 2 hides Chao throughout levels to be found in a free play mode. In the 2008 Nintendo DS role-playing game Sonic Chronicles: The Dark Brotherhood, Chao eggs are hidden throughout the in-game universe for the player to find and hatch. The resulting infant Chao can be equipped to characters. This affects the characters' performance in battle; for example, one kind will increase the character's hit points. The game features a multiplayer mode in which Chao can be traded between players who each have a copy of the game. Chao take the form of an item in the "Panel Flip" party game of the 2009 Wii and DS game Mario & Sonic at the Olympic Winter Games. Each player's object is to claim as many panels as possible in a six-by-six grid; finding a Chao upon flipping a panel claims all panels in a given row or column for the player. One mission in Sonic Generations (2011) involves racing against Cream the Rabbit to collect lost Chao in a city location.

Cream, a prominent character in the series, has a Chao named Cheese as a partner, who wears a red bowtie to distinguish himself from other Chao. In a move to keep her image safe, she often uses him to attack enemies instead of doing so herself. Other notable Chao include Chaos, guardian of the Chao, who serves as an antagonist in Sonic Adventure; Omochao, a robotic Chao who appears in several games as a means of player tutorial; and Chocola, Cheese's twin whom Cream, Amy Rose, and Big the Cat search for over the course of Sonic Heroes.

Chao have also made appearances in video games outside the Sonic the Hedgehog series. In the 2004 PlayStation 2 game Sega Superstars; the player uses points earned during the game to please a pet Chao. Marking the introduction of the character Sonic the Hedgehog to the 2008 Wii game Super Smash Bros. Brawl, Chao and other characters from the Sonic the Hedgehog series appear as collectible trophies and stickers. Chao also make a cameo appearance in the 2001 GameCube port of Phantasy Star Online within a questline called "The Fake in Yellow". Through the completion of the quest and a few other steps involved, it can allow the player to gain access to a Game Boy Advance Machine which gives you an option to download the otherwise unobtainable Tails Chao.

They also appear as trophies in Super Smash Bros. for 3DS and Wii U and as spirits in Super Smash Bros. Ultimate.

In other media
Chao were recurring characters in the Sonic X anime that ran from 2003 to 2006. In the episode "Little Chao Lost", Cheese becomes lost while swimming in a stream. The main characters find him at the stream's end, in a Chao colony, where Doctor Eggman shows up to steal a supposed Chaos Emerald from them until he is defeated. Later on, in "Flood Fight", a colony of Chao appears after a battle with Chaos; they turn out to be Chaos' old friends and embrace it as it leaves with Tikal the Echidna to return to the past.

Chao have also made occasional appearances in Archie Comics' Sonic the Hedgehog comic book series. They debuted in an Sonic Adventure-based story arc, where they work together with Tikal to defeat Chaos. At one point, Sonic, Tails, and Knuckles find a Chao garden and one Chao followed Sonic home, and after spending time around his Roboticized father came to resemble Omochao. However, Eggman destroys the garden, and the Chao migrate to a lake. Much later, Cream and her mother Vanilla protect a frightened but incompetent group of Chao from Eggman's assistant, Snively. Cream's friend Amy Rose realizes they are the same group from the lake and, to Cream's delight, suggests that the lake can be converted to a Chao garden. Following the comic reboot, Cheese continued to accompany Cream while Chocola was revealed to live with her mother Vanilla and Gemerl (from Sonic Advance 3). The heroes would also discover a Chao Garden hidden in an undersea cavern whose inhabitants included an ancient Chao named Aquarius and a guard dog-like Chao named Crusher.

Chao were prominently featured in the official web short "Chao in Space". The premise references billboard props in the Sonic Adventure series, which appeared to advertise a fictional movie of the same name. The short alternates between a Chao's dream in which it is piloting a space ship, and between Sonic trying to keep the aforementioned Chao under control as it sleepwalks. The short was accompanied by the release of some related merchandise through the official Sega Shop website.

In IDW Publishing's Sonic the Hedgehog comic book series, Chao have a prominent role in the "Chao Races & Badnik Bases" arc, in which Rouge competes in Chao races with Cream's Chao, Cheese, to defeat champion Chao racer Clutch and obtain parts for a nearly-destroyed E-123 Omega from him. However, Clutch demands Rouge surrender Cheese to him if he loses. Shadow reveals Clutch to be abusive to his Chao, locking up his losing ones in a cage.  The group eventually frees and rescues Clutch's losing Chao with help from their new friend Belle and her built-in lockpicker.

Reception and impact
Chao and the Chao-raising 
system have received generally positive reviews. In a review of Sonic Adventure, GameSpot's Peter Bartholow stated that "with the Chao-breeding simulation and the minigames, Sonic offers much more beyond the completion of its story." IGN stated that "SA more than has the extras department covered." This enthusiasm was extended to IGN's reviews of Sonic Adventure 2, Sonic Advance, and Sonic Adventure DX: Director's Cut. GameSpot's Shane Satterfield was critical of the Chao raising feature in Sonic Adventure 2: Battle, stating that "there's little in the way of interactivity" and that "the Chao training aspect using the Game Boy Advance is little more than a novelty." However, GameSpy's Shane Bettenhausen praised the feature in the game, comparing Chao to Tamagotchi digital pets. GameSpot's Frank Provo noted the appeal to "those people who might only enjoy pinball in passing" that Chao brought to Sonic Pinball Party. 1UP.com's Chris Baker called the Chao feature in Sega Superstars "ultimately worthless... but some might find it amusing." In a review of Sonic Chronicles: The Dark Brotherhood, GameSpot's Shiva Stella praised the level of strategy that the game's Chao system added. Destructoid's Jim Sterling voiced a similar opinion, though they said that Chao had been "rubbish" in previous games.

A Chao keychain was released as part of a Sonic X character keychain series. Between July 27 and September 8, 2002, Sega hosted events at Tokyo-based department stores to promote upcoming Sega video games. Attendees could download "Chao Mini Garden"s and exclusive Chao to their copies of Sonic Advance. Chao clothing clips, along with accessories based on other Sega characters, were available.

Mary Jane Irwin of IGN used "Chao program" to describe Pokémon Channel in her review of the game.

See also

Wisps
Slime (Dragon Quest)
Toad (Mario)

References

External links

Chao Laboratory (archived)
Chao at Sonic-City (archived)
Chao at Sonic Channel 

Child characters in video games
Fictional karateka
Sonic the Hedgehog characters
Video game characters introduced in 1998
Video game mascots
Nobility characters in video games
Video game species and races
Virtual pets